The 2009 Nielsen Pro Tennis Championship was a professional tennis tournament played on outdoor hard courts. It was the 18th edition of the tournament which was part of the 2009 ATP Challenger Tour. It took place in Winnetka, Illinois, between 29 June and 5 July 2009.

Singles entrants

Seeds

 Rankings are as of June 22, 2009.

Other entrants
The following players received wildcards into the singles main draw:
  Alex Bogomolov Jr.
  Samuel Groth
  Dennis Nevolo
  Phillip Simmonds

The following players received entry from the qualifying draw:
  Juan-Manuel Elizondo
  G.D. Jones
  Alex Kuznetsov
  Tim Smyczek

Champions

Singles

 Alex Kuznetsov def.  Tim Smyczek, 6–4, 7–6(1)

Doubles

 Carsten Ball /  Travis Rettenmaier def.  Brett Joelson /  Ryan Sweeting, 6–1, 6–2

References
Official site

Nielsen Pro Tennis Championship
Nielsen Pro Tennis Championship
Niel
Nielsen Pro Tennis Championship
Nielsen Pro Tennis Championship
Nielsen Pro Tennis Championship